Schraalenburgh may refer to:

Dumont, New Jersey
South Schraalenburgh Church
Schraalenburgh North Church